Is Money Everything? is a 1923 American silent drama film directed by Glen Lyons and starring Norman Kerry, Miriam Cooper and Martha Mansfield.

Cast
 Norman Kerry as John Brand
 Miriam Cooper as Marion Brand
 Andrew Hicks as Sam Slack
 John Sylvester as Rev. John Brooks
 Martha Mansfield as Mrs. Justine Pelham
 William Bailey as Roy Pelham
 Lawrence Brooke as Phil Graham

References

Bibliography
 Lowe, Denise. An Encyclopedic Dictionary of Women in Early American Films: 1895-1930. Routledge, 2014.

External links
 

1923 films
1923 drama films
1920s English-language films
American silent feature films
Silent American drama films
American black-and-white films
1920s American films